"Secret of My Heart" is a song by Japanese singer songwriter Mai Kuraki, taken from her debut album Delicious Way (2000). It was released on April 26, 2000 and peaked at number two on the Oricon Weekly Singles Chart.

It was used as an ending theme for the anime series Detective Conan, for which she would later sing 20 more theme songs. "Secret of My Heart" was certificated Million by Recording Industry Association of Japan and won the Japan Gold Disc Award for Song of the Year.

Commercial performance
"Secret of My Heart" debuted at number two on the Oricon Weekly Singles Chart with 410,550 physical copies sold. The song charted on the chart for 16 weeks and has sold over 968,980 physical copies. "Secret of My Heart" became the singer's second best-selling song behind "Love, Day After Tomorrow" (1999) and has been certificated Million for physical sales and Gold for digital sales by Recording Industry Association of Japan.

Track listing

Charts

Weekly charts

Monthly charts

Year-end charts

Certification and sales

|-
! rowspan="2" scope="row"| Japan (RIAJ)
| Million
| 968,980 
|-
| Gold
| 100,000+ 
|-
|}

References

External links
Mai Kuraki Official Website

2000 singles
2000 songs
Mai Kuraki songs
Giza Studio singles
Case Closed songs
Songs written by Aika Ohno
Songs written by Mai Kuraki
Song recordings produced by Daiko Nagato